NNSL may refer to:
 Northern News Services, a news company based in Yellowknife, Northwest Territories 
 Nigerian National Shipping Line, a defunct national flag carrier